Arjin (also Romanized as Arjīn and Arojīn; also known as Ardzhin) is a village in Soltaniyeh Rural District, Soltaniyeh District, Abhar County, Zanjan Province, Iran. At the 2006 census, its population was 164, in 48 families.

References 

Populated places in Abhar County